The Doncaster Saturday Football League is a football competition for clubs in the Doncaster area of England.

History
The competition was formed as the Doncaster & District Senior League for the 1925–26 season. In 2020, it was renamed the Doncaster Saturday Football League.

Current member clubs (2022–23)

Premier Division
Adwick Park Foresters
Armthorpe Welfare reserves
Bawtry Town
Bentley Village
Brodsworth Main
Denaby United
Epworth Town Colts
Gainsborough Town
Maltby Juniors
Rossington Main reserves
St Joseph's Rockware of Worksop reserves

Division One
Airmyn
Askern Miners reserves
AFC Bentley reserves
Bessacarr reserves
Bridon
Doncaster City Vikings
Doncaster Town
Epworth Town Colts development
ISG Doncaster
Kinsley Boys reserves
New Inn
Pilkingtons
Upton United Juniors
Yorkshire Main reserves
|}

League champions

References

 
Football leagues in England
Football in South Yorkshire
Sport in the Metropolitan Borough of Doncaster
Sports leagues established in 1925
1925 establishments in England
Football competitions in Yorkshire